Benjamin Franklin Mason (March 31, 1804 – January 15, 1871) or B.F. Mason was an artist in New England in the mid-19th century. He worked in "Boston, Troy, Buffalo, ... Milwaukee," and Woodstock, Vermont. Around 1852 he kept a studio in Boston's Tremont Temple.

References

Further reading
 Arthur K D Healy. B.F. Mason, journeyman portrait painter, 1804–1871: a commemorative exhibition of local portraits, May 15 to Oct. 15, 1971. Middlebury, Vt.: Sheldon Museum, 1971.

1804 births
1871 deaths
American artists